The Strawberry Shortcake Movie: Sky's the Limit is a 2009 computer-animated adventure film directed by Michael Hack and Mucci Fassett. It serves as the pilot for Strawberry Shortcake's Berry Bitty Adventures, a series that aired one year after the film's release. It also takes place after a pilot cartoon based on it.

Synopsis
After the Berryworks water supply is blocked by a giant rock brought down by a lightning storm, Strawberry Shortcake and her friends are desperate to find a water source before they will have to evacuate their hometown, Berry Bitty City, for good to live in another region far away, but also a large source of water. She then hears the legend about an ancient artifact found in the mountains to expose eternal water when revealed to sunlight. She and her friends head off on a quest to retrieve the object and try to save their town with it, but unknown to them, the main "legend" is actually a false hoax.

Production
When Hasbro had won the TV license from Playmates in 2008, American Greetings, the original owner of the Strawberry Shortcake franchise, announced a new series to debut in 2010, but would first produce a pilot cartoon and a film to introduce the new setting. The film first began production in August and ended later in June 2009. It was first screened in the FOX Studios in Los Angeles on July 31. It was then directly released on DVD and Blu-Ray by 20th Century Fox on September 15 the same year and was also distributed by Kidtoon Films in April 2011.

In France, it made its premiere as a TV movie on Playhouse Disney on December 5, 2009 and was later released on DVD on December 9.

Cast
 Anna Cummer as Strawberry Shortcake 
 Ashleigh Ball as Plum Pudding/Berrykin #2
 Ingrid Nilson as Raspberry Torte
 Janyse Jaud as Orange Blossom/Berrykin #3
 Britt McKillip as Blueberry Muffin/Small Berrykin
 Andrea Libman as Lemon Meringue/Princess Berrykin
 Paul Dobson as Mr. Longface/Construction Berrykin/Berrykin #1

Reception

Common Sense Media gave the film 2 out of 5 stars.

References

External links

 
 
 

2009 films
2009 fantasy films
2009 direct-to-video films
2009 computer-animated films
2000s American animated films
2000s French animated films
2000s children's adventure films
2000s children's fantasy films
2000s children's animated films
2000s fantasy adventure films
2000s English-language films
American computer-animated films
American children's animated adventure films
American children's animated fantasy films
American fantasy adventure films
American direct-to-video films
American television series premieres
Canadian computer-animated films
Canadian children's animated films
Canadian animated fantasy films
Canadian fantasy adventure films
Canadian direct-to-video films
Canadian television series premieres
French computer-animated films
French children's adventure films
French animated fantasy films
French fantasy adventure films
Direct-to-video animated films
Television films as pilots
Reboot films
Strawberry Shortcake films
English-language Canadian films
English-language French films
Films based on toys
Animated films based on animated television series
Animated films about children
Animated films about friendship
Films about water
Mountains in fiction
Films set in 2009
Spring (season) in culture
20th Century Fox films
20th Century Fox animated films
20th Century Fox direct-to-video films
2000s Canadian films